Henry de Gorsse (19 March 1868 - 7 March 1936) was a French writer, playwright, screenwriter and lyricist.

A prolific writer, Henry de Gorsse has authored many plays, comedies, operettas and vaudevilles, often in collaboration with other writers.

Henry de Gorsse is the uncle of the lawyer and historian Pierre de Gorsse as well as the brother of another historian, Bertrand de Gorsse.

Works 
Author

 1894: Monseigneur, 1-act comedy by Henry de Gorsse and Charles Meyreuil 
 1895: Paris au pied du mur, by Henry de Gorsse and Jules Oudot 
 1896: L'Impôt sur la Revue, 1-acr news by Henry de Gorsse and Jules Oudot 
 1896: Ballottage, 1-act comedy by Henry de Gorsse and Jules Oudot 
 1896: Tonton, operetta in 1 act, by Henry de Gorsse and Fernand Beissier, music by Paul Blétry 
 1897: Au Chat qui pelote, operetta in 1 act, by Henry de Gorsse and Jules Oudot 
 1898: Le roi du timbre-poste, Henry de Gorsse and Gérard de Beauregard 
 1899: Les Plumes du paon, Henry de Gorsse and Gérard de Beauregard 
 1899: Caillette, comedy in one act, by Henry de Gorsse and Charles Meyreuil
 1901: Les Marraines du siècle, féerie à grand spectacle, by Henry de Gorsse and Maurice Froyez
 1902: L'Auréole, 5-act comedy by Henry de Gorsse and Jules Chancel 
 1903: Miche, ou Le nez qui remue, comédie bouffe (operetta) in 3 acts by Henry de Gorsse and Maurice Soulié 
 1904: Petit-Jeannot ; Fée Totorote ; Pour être seuls ! ; Cocard et Rataboul ; Le Sorcier ; L'Edelweiss ; La Soirée Potiron, by Henry de Gorsse. 
 1904: La Jeunesse de Cyrano de Bergerac by Henry de Gorsse and Joseph Jacquin (with a preface by Edmond Rostand)
 1905: Les Cadets de Gascogne by Henry de Gorsse and Joseph Jacquin 
 1905: Madame l'Ordonnance, vaudeville in 3 acts by Henry de Gorsse and Jules Chancel 
 1905: Folle escapade ; Les Alouettes d'eau ; Le Grillon by Henry de Gorsse 
 1906: Allo !... de Vichy !..., revue féerique in 2 acts and 10 tableaux, by Henry de Gorsse and Georges Nanteuil 
 1907: Le Coup de Jarnac, vaudeville in 3 acts by Henry de Gorsse and Maurice de Marsan 
 1907: Esprit, es-tu là... ?, vaudeville in 1 act by Henry de Gorsse 
 1907: Le 1.000e constat, vaudeville in 3 acts by Henry de Gorsse and Louis Forest. 
 1910: M. Toto, premier policier de France,by Henry de Gorsse 
 1910: Arsène Lupin vs. Herlock Sholmes, play in 4 acts and 15 tableaux from the novels by Maurice Leblanc by Henry de Gorsse and Victor Darlay, music by Marius Baggers. (performed at Théâtre du Châtelet le 28 octobre 1910)
 1911: La Gamine, 4-act comedy by Henry de Gorsse and Pierre Veber (performed at théâtre de la Renaissance 24 March 1911) 
 1912: Cinq semaines en aéroplane by Henry de Gorsse 
 1913: Le Procureur Haliers, 4-act play, adaptée after Paul Lindau, by Henry de Gorsse and Louis Forest, Théâtre Antoine, 15 October 
 1916: Madame et son filleul, 3-act play by Henry de Gorsse, Maurice Hennequin, Pierre Veber, adapted by Georges Monca
 1917: Le Système D ou Dodoche et Lulu, vaudeville in three acts by Henry de Gorsse, Pierre Veber and Marcel Guillemaud 
 1921: L'aeroplane invisible  by Henry de Gorsse
 1921: Un réveillon au Père-Lachaise, play in three little acts by Henry de Gorsse and Pierre Veber 
 1921: Trois poules pour un coq, vaudeville in three acts by Henry de Gorsse and Nicolas Nancey 
 1921: Oscar ! tu le seras, vaudeville in three acts by Henry de Gorsse and Nicolas Nancey. 
 1921: Dolly I Love You !, operetta in three acts by Henry de Gorsse and Victor Darlay, music by Félix Fourdrain. 
 1922: Le Coup d'Abélard, vaudeville in three acts by Henry de Gorsse and Nicolas Nancey 
 1922: L'Enfance pyrénéenne d'Edmond Rostand ; les années de Luchon ; les premiers essais 
 1923: Chouquette et son as, vaudeville in three acts by Henry de Gorsse, Maurice Hennequin, Marcel Guillemaud
 1923: Un homme sur la paille, comédie-vaudeville in three acts. After a short story by André Birabeau, Nicolas Nancey and Henry de Gorsse 
 1924: Le Yacht mystérieux 
 1924: Par-dessus les moulins, 3-act play by Henry de Gorsse and René Peter 
 1925: La Hussarde: operetta in three acts, by Henry de Gorsse, Victor Darlay and Georges Nanteuil. Music by Félix Fourdrain 
 1925: J'aurai Lulu. Vaudeville in three acts by Henry de Gorsse and André Mycho 
 1927: Le Petit Héros du Bled, by Henry de Gorsse and Pierre Guitet-Vauquelin
 1927: Dame au domino, operetta in three acts, by Henry de Gorsse and Victor Darlay, music by Henri Hirschmann 
 1928: Chichi, comédie-vaudeville in three acts by Henry de Gorsse and Pierre Veber 
 1929: La Femme au chat comedy in 3 acts by Henry de Gorsse and Pierre Veber after the Italian play by Oreste Poggio, mise en scène Harry Baur, Théâtre Daunou, 18 May 
 1931: Sans tambour ni trompette: operetta in three acts and four tableaux. Libretto by Henry de Gorsse and Pierre Veber, music by de Henri Casadesus 
 1935: Le Petit Don Quichotte, Henry de Gorsse and Pierre Humble. 

Screenwriter
 1910: L'Infidélité d'Ernest 
 1910: Mil Adultérios, directed by João Colas
 1916: Le avventure di Colette, directed by R. Savarese, d'après la pièce La Gamine d'Henry de Gorsse and Pierre Veber
 1918: The Studio Girl, directed by Charles Giblyn after the play La Gamine by Henry de Gorsse and Pierre Veber
 1919: Madame et son filleul, directed by Georges Monca and Charles Prince after the eponymous play by Henry de Gorsse and Pierre Veber
 1934: Le Mystère Imberger or Le Spectre de Monsieur Imberger, directed by Jacques Séverac 
 1936: La Petite Dame du wagon-lit, directed by Maurice Cammage after Henry de Gorsse and Nicolas Nancey

Lyricist
 1900: Un miracle, lyrics by Henry de Gorsse, music by Bertrand de Gorsse, sung by Louise Balthy
 1903: V'la l'Métro, lyrics by Henry de Gorsse and Adrien Vély 
 1903: Valse d'hier, lyrics by Henry de Gorsse and Maurice Froyez, music by Depret
 1903: Paris sans fil, lyrics by Henry de Gorsse and Georges Nanteuil, sung by Dranem

External links
 

19th-century French dramatists and playwrights
20th-century French dramatists and playwrights
20th-century French screenwriters
French lyricists
People from Haute-Garonne
1868 births
1936 deaths